A novice is an inexperienced person or creature. It may also refer to:

Geography
Novice, Texas, a small community
Novice Independent School District, Texas
Novice Gail Fawcett (1909–1998), eighth president of Ohio State University

Books
The Novice (poem), an 1840 poem by Mikhail Lermontov
Novice, Kmetijske in rokodelske novice ("Agricultural and Artisan News") Slovene newspaper from the 19th century
The Novice (novel), a fantasy novel by Taran Matharu.

Music
"Le Novice", art song by Edouard Lalo (1823–92)
Novice (album), a 1989 album by French rocker Alain Bashung

Other
Novice (racehorse), a class of horse in National Hunt racing
 The Novice, a 2006 film starring Alan Arkin and Jacob Pitts
 The Novice, a 2021 film starring Isabelle Fuhrman
Novice, a French naval rank
Novice, Amauris ochlea, a butterfly of southern and southeastern Africa

See also
Novuss, a game of physical skill